Karen Mnatsakanyan (born 3 March 1977) is a retired Armenian Greco-Roman wrestler. He is a World Championships silver medalist and two-time European Champion. Mnatsakanyan is only the second Wrestling European Champion in Greco-Roman wrestling from Armenia, after Armen Nazaryan. He also came in first place at the 1993 Cadet World Championships and 1997 Junior European Championships and competed at the 2000 Summer Olympics and 2008 Summer Olympics.

References

External links
 

1977 births
Living people
Sportspeople from Yerevan
Armenian wrestlers
Armenian male sport wrestlers
Wrestlers at the 2000 Summer Olympics
Wrestlers at the 2008 Summer Olympics
Olympic wrestlers of Armenia
World Wrestling Championships medalists
European Wrestling Championships medalists
21st-century Armenian people